Josep Antoni Santamaría i Mateo (Xirivella, Spain, 16 July 1957) is a Spanish politician who belongs to the governing Spanish Socialist Workers' Party (PSOE).

Married with two children, Santamaría began architectural studies but did not complete them and subsequently worked for the Valencian regional administration. Until his election to the national parliament he served as mayor of the town of Xirivella to the immediate west of Valencia. He also served as PSOE secretary in the l'Horta Sud area which covers the satellite towns south of Valencia city.

He was elected to the Congress of Deputies as a deputy for Valencia in 2004 and has remained a deputy since then. For the 2008 election he was placed seventh on the PSOE list (the party had won seven seats at the 2004 election) and was the fifteenth of the sixteen candidates elected.

External links
 Biography at Spanish Congress website
 Biography at El.pais.com site accessed 14 September 2008

1957 births
Living people
People from Horta Oest
Politicians from the Valencian Community
Spanish Socialist Workers' Party politicians
Members of the 8th Congress of Deputies (Spain)
Members of the 9th Congress of Deputies (Spain)